David Starke (15 September 1879 – 11 December 1954) was an Australian rules footballer who played with St Kilda in the Victorian Football League (VFL).

Notes

External links 

1879 births
1954 deaths
Australian rules footballers from Melbourne
St Kilda Football Club players
People from South Melbourne